Ashley Springer is an American actor who is best known for his role in the 2007 American horror comedy Teeth, written and directed by Mitchell Lichtenstein. His other films include Dare, The Visitor, and The Wolf of Wall Street.

Springer attended Stuyvesant High School. In 2015, he produced and acted in The Impossibilities, which was nominated for a Gotham Award in the category of Breakthrough Short-Form Series.

Filmography

Film

Television

References

External links 
 

American male film actors
Tisch School of the Arts alumni
Stuyvesant High School alumni
Living people
Year of birth missing (living people)
Place of birth missing (living people)
People from Manhattan
Male actors from New York City